The Boneyard Falls are an overflow of waves located at  on the Bombo Headland, near Kiama on the south coast of New South Wales, Australia. Though looking like a waterfall, the falls are caused by waves crashing on the opposite side of the rocky headland.

See also

List of waterfalls of New South Wales

References

Waterfalls of New South Wales
Kiama, New South Wales